Harry Sprenger (13 June 1882 – 1958) was a British wrestler. He competed in the men's freestyle bantamweight at the 1908 Summer Olympics.

References

External links
 

1882 births
1958 deaths
British male sport wrestlers
Olympic wrestlers of Great Britain
Wrestlers at the 1908 Summer Olympics
Sportspeople from London